Jalkhand is a town situated in the Mansehra district of Hazara, Pakistan. It is a beautiful place for tourists. Pyala Lake (a round lake in Kaghan Valley) is also situated in Jalkhand.

See also 
Pyala Lake
Kaghan Valley
Lalazar

References 

Populated places in Mansehra District